Ryszard Kaczyński (born 25 December 1954) is a Polish politician. He was elected to the Sejm on 25 September 2005, getting 7750 votes in 26 Gdynia district as a candidate from the Law and Justice list.

See also
Members of Polish Sejm 2005-2007

External links
Ryszard Kaczyński - parliamentary page - includes declarations of interest, voting record, and transcripts of speeches.

Members of the Polish Sejm 2005–2007
1954 births
Living people
People from Wejherowo